Syd Matters is a French band fronted by composer Jonathan Morali. The other band members are Jean-Yves Lozac'h, Olivier Marguerit, Remi Alexandre and Clement Carle. The name Syd Matters comes from the slight modification of the names of two Pink Floyd members: Syd Barrett and Roger Waters.

2001–2005: Jonathan Morali 
Syd Matters is also the pseudonym of the band's frontman, Jonathan Morali. Morali was born in Paris on 22 May 1980. He started his performing career playing at small bars until winning a contest by French magazine Les Inrockuptibles, and therefore signing a recording contract with Third Side Records. His first published work is "Fever In Winter, Shiver In June", an EP released in 2002. In 2003, "A Whisper and A Sigh" was released consisting of 11 tracks, marking his first album-length work. After this album was released, Morali constructed a new quintet band under the same name, Syd Matters, marking the band's official creation in April 2005. Early May 2005, Morali then released his second album, the first of which was recorded with his new band, titled "Someday We Will Foresee Obstacles". A mixture of folk and melancholic pop, his music combines slow melodies with acoustic instruments while holding true to its roots in electronic music. Morali was also part of the French rock band Tahiti Boy and the Palmtree Family.

2005–present day 
A compilation CD named Syd Matters, was released in America on 16 June 2006. A single disc that contains various songs from his two previous albums, it was released under the label, V2 North America. In January 2008, he released the album "Ghost Days". On 16 March 2011, Syd Matters released their latest album, "Brotherocean". Among his other works are a duet with Ane Brun, "Little Lights" which was released in 2005.

In 2015, the band had two of their songs, "To All Of You", and "Obstacles" featured in the popular video game Life Is Strange. Jonathan Morali would also compose the original soundtrack, released to critical acclaim.

Media appearances 
His songs "To All of You" ("American Girls") and "Hello Sunshine", a Super Furry Animals cover, were featured in the television series The O.C. in season 3's The Party Favor and season 4's The Metamorphosis, respectively. Additionally, "Obstacles" and "To All of You" were featured in Dontnod Entertainment's 2015 video game Life Is Strange. Morali also composed the original score for the game. The soundtrack to Life Is Strange won numerous awards including: best soundtrack at the 2015 PlayStation Universe awards, best soundtrack at the Game Informer Best of 2015 awards and best soundtrack at the Titanium Awards. Following this, Morali also collaborated with director Rémi Chayé to create the score for the animated film Long Way North (2015), where he included two tracks by Syd Matters in the soundtrack. In 2020, Syd Matters performed a composition of The Metamorphosis by Franz Kafka for French Radio in which the book was read by actor Micha Lescot with accompanied music.

Reputation 
Since Syd Matters’ debut, their experimental genre has been continuously reviewed by critics. Their second album, "Someday We Will Foresee Obstacles", brought the band mainstream attention with a review in the 32nd issue of Music Week. The unique sound they produce has been said to draw inspiration from genres such as prog rock, dub music, and Traditional pop, while also resembling that of singer-songwriter artists but at its core is often considered a mix between folk and electronic genres. In their reviews, they have also been compared to other artists such as Fleet Foxes, Fionn Regan, Grandaddy, The Flaming Lips, and Nick Drake.

Discography  
Studio albums
 A Whisper and A Sigh (2003)
 Someday We Will Foresee Obstacles (2006)
 Ghost Days (2008)
 Brotherocean (2011)

Extended plays
 Fever in Winter, Shiver in June (2002)
Everything Else (2007)

Compilations
Syd Matters (2006)

Compositions
 La Question Humaine (2007)

References

External links
 Jonathan Morali Official website

French rock music groups
Because Music artists
Musical groups from Paris